The Santa Fe CF7 is an EMD F-unit railroad locomotive that has had its streamlined carbody removed and replaced with a custom-made, "general purpose" body in order to adapt the unit for switching duty. All of the conversions were performed by the Atchison, Topeka & Santa Fe Railway's Cleburne, Texas, workshops between February 1970 and 1978. This was Santa Fe's most notable remanufacturing project, with 233 completed between 1970 - March 1978.Santa Fe's born-again road-switchers Railway Age September 14, 1981 pages 40-44, 106 The program was initiated in response to a system-wide need for more than 200 additional four-axle diesel road switchers to meet projected motive power demands on branch lines and secondary main lines.

Santa Fe's aging fleet of F7 units were approaching retirement age in 1970. These units were remanufactured into switchers and named CF7. Santa Fe used them for a decade and sold many of them to short lines around the states. Many of those were still being used as of 2003.

In service
The CF7s worked within all segments of the Santa Fe system. While most saw action switching cars and transporting local freight, others could be found in multiple unit consists hauling mainline drags. The units distinguished themselves working on potash trains between Clovis and Carlsbad, New Mexico; Nos. 2612–2625, all equipped with remote control equipment (RCE), were typically "mated" to road slugs (converted cabless F-units). CF7s also powered grain trains across the Plains Division.

The Santa Fe had planned in the mid-1980s to renumber its CF7 fleet from 2649–2417 to 1131–1000 and repaint the units in the new Kodachrome paint scheme, all in preparation for the planned Southern Pacific Santa Fe Railroad merger. However, the Interstate Commerce Commission subsequently denied the merger application, and no CF7s were decorated in the new livery. Amtrak used some of them, with mixed results.

Afterlife

Changing philosophies regarding motive power expenditures led the Santa Fe to begin trimming its CF7 roster in 1984. The majority of the locomotives were sold for as little as $20,000 to short-line and regional railroads such as the Rail Link, Inc., the York Railway, and the Maryland & Delaware Railroad (6 were involved in wrecks and 3 others sent directly to the scrap yards), though Amtrak and GE Transportation were among the major initial purchasers. By 1987, the company had divested itself of all of its CF7s. These locomotives have well withstood the test of time, and have long outlived their projected service lives, two times, both as original F-units and as rebuilds. As of 2017, all CF7s still in service are over 60 years old.

Preservation
Several CF7s are preserved and operational on many tourist and local trains. Among them are:
#2546 at the Kentucky Railway Museum, and #2571 at the Oklahoma Railway Museum,

See also
 Beep (locomotive)
 List of GM-EMD locomotives
 Santa Fe SD26

References

  Includes background and modeling information, equipment rosters, and a photo gallery.

Further reading

External links

Atchison, Topeka and Santa Fe Railway locomotives
B-B locomotives
Electro-Motive Diesel locomotives
Diesel-electric locomotives of the United States
Railway locomotives introduced in 1970
Rebuilt locomotives
Standard gauge locomotives of the United States